Amityville:  A New Generation is a 1993 direct to video American supernatural horror film directed by John Murlowski. It is the seventh film based on The Amityville Horror.

Plot 
Before the DeFeos moved into 112 Ocean Avenue in Amityville, the Bronners occupied the house. In 1966, the Bronner family's eldest son, Franklin, killed his parents and two siblings during Thanksgiving dinner. Bronner, who had a long history of mental illness, claimed to have committed the familicide at the behest of otherworldly forces within the house and was committed to Danamore State Hospital. Years later, his wife and their young son, Keyes Terry, visited Bronner. Despite being sedated, Bronner killed his wife in front of Keyes. Keyes repressed the memory of visiting Danamore and never received any notification about his father being discharged from it in 1986.

In 1993, Keyes, now a photographer, lives in an inner-city boarding house with his girlfriend, Llanie. Dick Cutler owns the boarding house, and its other tenants include a painter named Suki and a sculptor named Pauli. Bronner tracks down Keyes and gives him a mirror that he took from the house in Amityville. The mirror is demonic, and it kills Suki and her ex-boyfriend, Raymond. After Bronner is found dead, Keyes begins looking into his past and realizes that Bronner was his father after visiting Danamore.

The demon in the mirror assumes Suki's form to kill Dick and afterward begins tormenting Keyes by turning into Bronner. Keyes gets sucked into the mirror, which brings him to a Hellish version of Danamore, where he encounters undead versions of Raymond, Suki, Dick, and Bronner. The demon then returns Keyes to the real world and makes it clear that it wants Keyes to reenact the massacre of the Bronner family by shooting Llanie, Pauli, and Dick's wife at the boarding house's Thanksgiving art show. Keyes resists the demon's influence and breaks the mirror, prompting the assigned Detective Clark to sardonically quip, "Seven years bad luck."

Cast 
 Ross Partridge as Keyes Terry
 Julia Nickson-Soul as Suki
 Lala Sloatman as Llanie (credited as Lala)
 David Naughton as Dick Cutler
 Barbara Howard as Janet Cutler
 Jack Orend as Franklin Bronner (as Jack R. Orend)
 Richard Roundtree as Pauli
 Terry O'Quinn as Detective Clark
 Robert Rusler as Ray
 Lin Shaye as Nurse Turner
 Karl Johnson as Cafe Owner
 Ralph Ahn as Mr. Kim
 Tom Wright as Morgue Attendant
 Bob Jennings as Rookie Cop
 Jon Steuer as Young Keyes
 Robert Harvey as Mr. Bronner (as Bob Harvey)
 Ken Bolognese as Critic
 Abbe Rowlins as Academic
 Joseph Schuster as Young Man
 J.P. Stevens as Teen
 Kim Anderson as Critic
 Claudia Gold as Critic

Release 
It was released direct to video in 1993 by Republic Pictures Home Video in R-rated and unrated versions. Lionsgate Home Entertainment (under license from FremantleMedia North America) has released this film to DVD in July 2005. In 2019, Vinegar Syndrome (under license from Multicom Entertainment Group) released the film on Blu Ray in the US which was included in the boxset ‘Amityville: The Cursed Collection’. In 2022, the film was released on Blu Ray in the UK courtesy of Screenbound Pictures Ltd.

References

External links
 
 

1993 direct-to-video films
1993 films
1993 horror films
1993 independent films
1990s English-language films
1990s mystery films
1990s police films
1990s psychological horror films
1990s supernatural horror films
Adultery in films
American direct-to-video films
American haunted house films
American independent films
American mystery films
American police detective films
American psychological horror films
American sequel films
American supernatural horror films
Amityville Horror films
Demons in film
Direct-to-video horror films
Direct-to-video sequel films
Fiction about familicide
Films about father–son relationships
Films about amnesia
Films about artists
Films about landlords
Films about mass murder
Films about nightmares
Films about fictional painters
Films about photographers
Films about shapeshifting
Films based on American horror novels
Films directed by John Murlowski
Films scored by Daniel Licht
Films set in 1966
Films set in 1975
Films set in 1993
Films set in apartment buildings
Films set in Long Island
Films set in Los Angeles
Films set in psychiatric hospitals
Films shot in Los Angeles
Murder mystery films
Mystery horror films
Republic Pictures films
Sentient objects in fiction
Thanksgiving horror films
Uxoricide in fiction
1990s American films